Wetawit may refer to:
the Wetawit people
the Wetawit language